Rossouw is an Afrikaans surname, derived from the French Rousseau. It may refer to:

Chris Rossouw, South African rugby player (flyhalf)
Christiaan (Chris) Rossouw, South African rugby player (hooker)
Danie Rossouw (born 1978), South African rugby player
Jacques Rossouw, South African physician
Neil Rossouw (born 1976), Namibian cricketer
 Pieter Rossouw (cricketer)
 Pieter Rossouw (rugby player)
Rilee Rossouw, South African cricketer
Cobus Rossouw South African actor

See also

 Rossouw, Eastern Cape, South Africa

References

Afrikaans-language surnames
Surnames of French origin